Wenren Yuntao (born 27 February 1994) is a Chinese taekwondo practitioner. 

She won a bronze medal in flyweight at the 2017 World Taekwondo Championships, after being defeated by Panipak Wongpattanakit in the semifinal. She competed in bantamweight at the 2019 World Taekwondo Championships, where she was defeated by eventual gold medalist Phannapa Harnsujin in the 1/8-finals.

References

1994 births
Living people
People from Ningbo
People from Yuyao
Sportspeople from Zhejiang
Sportspeople from Ningbo
Chinese female taekwondo practitioners
Taekwondo practitioners at the 2018 Asian Games
World Taekwondo Championships medalists
Asian Games competitors for China
21st-century Chinese women